Jan Kubis may refer to:

 Jan Kubiš (1913-1942), Czech soldier and assassin of Reinhard Heydrich
 Ján Kubiš (born 1952), Slovak diplomat